Peters Peak is a snow-covered peak, 2,220 m, standing 4 nautical miles (7 km) north of Melrose Peak in the central part of Holyoake Range. Mapped by the United States Geological Survey (USGS) from tellurometer surveys and Navy air photos, 1960–62. Named by Advisory Committee on Antarctic Names (US-ACAN) for Merrill J. Peters, United States Antarctic Research Program (USARP) field assistant, 1962–63.

Mountains of the Ross Dependency
Shackleton Coast